Romsås Idrettslag is a sports club from Grorud, Oslo, Norway.

It was founded in 1972, and the club has sections for football, handball, floorball, orienteering, aerobic and artistic gymnastics

The football club currently plays in the Norwegian Third Division, where they have been playing since 2011. The name of the club's stadium is Bjøråsen. Notable former footballers include Jan Derek Sørensen, Mike Kjølø, Rocky Lekaj and Joshua King.

References

External links
Official website

Football clubs in Oslo
Association football clubs established in 1972
Sport in Oslo
1972 establishments in Norway